Please Like Me is an Australian television comedy-drama series created, written and directed by and starring Josh Thomas. It premiered on ABC2 on 28 February 2013. The show focuses on Josh (Josh Thomas) and his dysfunctional family and friends. The titles of each episode refer to either a food or drink. 

A total of 32 episodes of Please Like Me aired during the show's four seasons.

Series overview

Episodes

Season 1 (2013)

Season 2 (2014)

Season 3 (2015)

Season 4 (2016)

DVD Releases

References

External links 
 
 

Lists of Australian drama television series episodes